Corrour railway station is on the West Highland Line, near Loch Ossian on the Corrour Estate, in the Highland Region (formerly Inverness-shire) of Scotland. It is the highest mainline railway station in the United Kingdom. It is located between Rannoch and Tulloch, and is sited  from Craigendoran Junction, near Helensburgh. ScotRail manage the station and provide most services, along with Caledonian Sleeper.

History 
Corrour station was built by the West Highland Railway between 1893 and 1894 on its line linking Glasgow with Fort William, and was operated from its opening on 7 August 1894 by the North British Railway. It has a passing loop around an island platform with a siding on the east side. In common with the line's two other remote passing places, Gorton and Glen Douglas, it was built with a tall signalbox and an adjacent low building in which the signalman lived. The adjacent low building (in Corrour's case) was also used as a sub post office from 15 December 1896 and a Post Office telegraph office from 16 August 1898; Corrour even qualified as a post town. Later, the railway constructed a station house for the signalman on the east side of the tracks, and the original building became purely office accommodation for the railway and the post office.

Corrour was originally intended to be merely a passing place on the long section between Rannoch and Tulloch, called Luibruaridh (sic) after the nearest habitation, Luibruairidh, on the old drove road between Rannoch and Spean Bridge, about 1½ miles (2 km) northwest of the passing place. However, from its opening, its small island platform was used as a station, and the name Corrour was also used although Corrour Lodge at that time was where the drove road crossed Coire Odhar, some 5 miles (8 km) southeast of the station. However, when the station opened, estate traffic was facilitated by the building of a mile-long (1.5 km) track connecting the station to the old drove road as it passed near the head of Loch Ossian.

In the early days, there was so much estate business that the railway employed an extra clerkess during the grouse season. It was theoretically a private station for the use of the estate, but it was also used by the public from the start, despite its not appearing in public timetables until September 1934.

In 1897, the estate built a new lodge at the foot of Loch Ossian, 4½ miles (7 km) northeast of the station. There was, however, no vehicular access to the lodge from the public road system, so all goods (including vehicles) had to come and go by rail via Corrour station. Until the track along the south shore of Loch Ossian was built, the estate ran a small steamer from the lodge to the head of Loch Ossian (where Loch Ossian youth hostel is now), from which the station was only a little over a mile (2 km) away. In 1972, the Forestry Commission built a private macadamized road from the A86 at near Moy Lodge to Corrour Lodge, so for the first time there was vehicular access to the station, via Corrour Lodge and Moy Lodge – a total distance of 15 miles (24 km).

Corrour sub post and telegraph office closed on 5 March 1977.

During the construction of the Lochaber hydroelectric scheme in the 1930s, a small halt was located at Fersit, between Corrour and Tulloch, about 2 miles (3 km) short of the latter.

Since November 1985, all passenger trains have used the original "down" platform. The "up" loop remains, and is serviceable, but it is no longer used by passenger trains. There was originally a footbridge at Corrour station, providing an exit to the east side, but it was moved to Rannoch station, following the downgrading of the "up" loop at Corrour. Passengers now cross the line by a barrow crossing.

In 1998/1999, Corrour Estate replaced the former signalman's house with a new station house. This included business premises and lodging for their managers, and had electric power from a diesel generator. The station house subsequently had a number of tenants over the years, becoming an independent hostel, an SYHA hostel (in addition to the SYHA’s nearby hostel at Loch Ossian), and a restaurant. In 2015, the estate took over the running of the building, and after closure for refurbishment, reopened it as a bar and restaurant.

In 2012, the red stone chippings on the platform, which Network Rail acknowledged would be hazardous to wheelchair passengers, were replaced by a hard surface.

In 2013, Historic Scotland listed the disused signalbox (called the "old watchtower" by Network Rail) and the adjacent building as Category C (the tall boxes at Gorton and Glen Douglas had been demolished). Subsequently, Network Rail, in conjunction with the Corrour Estate and the Railway Heritage Trust, refurbished the signalbox, and in 2016, the estate opened three guest rooms in it.

Location 
The station is one of the most remote in the United Kingdom, at an isolated location on the northern edge of Rannoch Moor. It is not accessible by any public roads. The nearest road, the B846 road from Loch Rannoch to Rannoch station, is a ten-mile (16 km) walk away by hill track, although Rannoch station itself is only 7¼ route-miles (11.5 km) away by rail. Vehicular access is by a 15-mile (24 km) private road from a little west of Moy Lodge on the A86. Until the late 1980s, the only electrical power at the station was provided by batteries. The only telephone was the railway's system which linked Corrour only to the adjacent signal boxes at Rannoch and Tulloch, which were on the public telephone system.
 
At 1,340 ft (408 m) above sea level the station provides a starting point for hill-walkers and Munro-baggers. There is accommodation and a bar/restaurant available at the station and an SYHA youth hostel just over a mile (2 km) away at the head of Loch Ossian.

Facilities 

Corrour is unstaffed and there are no ticket-issuing facilities. There are no departure announcements but there is WiFi, a telephone help point, an electronic departure display and a Caledonian Sleeper digital information point. There is a shelter with bench seats and cycle racks. The station is lit by electric lights.

Passenger volume 
Its estimated usage of 14,344 (2018–2019) made it the busiest station on the line north of Crianlarich, apart from Fort William and Mallaig.

The statistics cover twelve month periods that start in April.

Services 

Corrour station is served by regular ScotRail passenger trains between Glasgow Queen Street and Fort William and Mallaig. These local services run three times a day in each direction on weekdays and Saturdays, but less frequently on Sundays (twice each way). In addition, Corrour is served by the Caledonian Sleeper (on request only) service between Fort William and London Euston via Glasgow Queen Street (Low Level) and Edinburgh (these run daily except Saturday nights in each direction). The sleeper also conveys seated coaches and can therefore also be used by regular West Highland passengers travelling to or from Glasgow or Edinburgh.

Cultural references 

The station, and the nearby mountain Leum Uilleim, gained fame when they were featured in a scene from the film Trainspotting. It also appeared in the fourth episode of the 2010 BBC series Secret Britain. The station also featured in the Young Guns video for the single "Weight of the World". The station is the primary location in Jos Stelling's film De Wisselwachter. It was also visited by Paul Merton in Episode 3 of his Channel 4 documentary series Paul Merton's Secret Stations. It also featured in an All the Stations documentary in 2019.

The route south from Corrour across the Moor of Rannoch to Rannoch Station itself was used as a filming location in the Harry Potter films where a Death Eater was seen to stand between the rails with an outstretched arm, to bring the approaching Hogwarts Express to a stand for the train to be inspected. Warner Brothers spent a couple of days with equipment based at Rannoch to facilitate the filming sequences.

References

Bibliography 

 
 
 
 McGregor, John A., All Stations to Mallaig, D. Bradford Barton Ltd, 1st edition, 1982. 
 Mountain Moor and Loch: on the Route of the West Highland Railway, Sir Joseph Causton & Sons, 1st edition, 1894
 Thomas, John, The West Highland Railway, David St John Thomas, 3rd edition, 1992, 
 Scotland: the Movie Location Guide – Trainspotting, Rannoch Moor Information on the station as it appears in "Trainspotting".
 Hidden Europe magazine – an article about Corrour from Hidden Europe magazine
 Article on the station by Ian Futers, four pages including track plan, photos, and description in Railway Modeller magazine for April 2008

External links 

Annotated video of Corrour station and restaurant

Railway stations in Highland (council area)
Former North British Railway stations
Railway stations in Great Britain opened in 1894
Railway stations served by ScotRail
Railway stations served by Caledonian Sleeper
Railway stations in Great Britain without road access
Railway request stops in Great Britain
Listed railway stations in Scotland
1894 establishments in Scotland